Silvio Román Guerra Burbano (born September 18, 1968 in San Gabriel, Carchi) an Ecuadorian runner.

Career
A member of Concentración Deportiva de Pichincha he represented Ecuador at the 1996 Summer Olympics in Atlanta, United States, the 2000 Summer Olympics in Sydney, Australia and the 2004 Summer Olympics in Athens, Greece. He also qualified for the 2008 Summer Olympics in Beijing, China. He has won many tournaments. He has held the Ecuadorian marathon record since 1997, 2:09:49. This was achieved at the Chicago Marathon.

Guerra has won numerous medals at the South American Cross Country Championships: starting with a silver medal in 1993, gold the following year, a second silver in 2000, and finally a bronze medal in 2005.

Achievements

References

External links

sports-reference

1968 births
Living people
People from San Gabriel, Ecuador
Ecuadorian male long-distance runners
Ecuadorian male marathon runners
Ecuadorian male steeplechase runners
Olympic athletes of Ecuador
Athletes (track and field) at the 1996 Summer Olympics
Athletes (track and field) at the 2000 Summer Olympics
Athletes (track and field) at the 2004 Summer Olympics
Athletes (track and field) at the 2008 Summer Olympics
Athletes (track and field) at the 1995 Pan American Games
Athletes (track and field) at the 1999 Pan American Games
Athletes (track and field) at the 2003 Pan American Games
Pan American Games medalists in athletics (track and field)
Pan American Games bronze medalists for Ecuador
South American Games gold medalists for Ecuador
South American Games silver medalists for Ecuador
South American Games medalists in athletics
Competitors at the 1990 South American Games
Medalists at the 1995 Pan American Games
20th-century Ecuadorian people
21st-century Ecuadorian people